Stanislav Henych (born 19 February 1949 in Jilemnice) is a Czechoslovakian former cross-country skier who competed during the 1970s. He won a silver medal in the 50 km at the 1974 FIS Nordic World Ski Championships in Falun.
His best olympic placing was 8th in the 4×10 km event at the 1972 Winter Olympics in Sapporo.

External links
 

1949 births
Czech male cross-country skiers
Czechoslovak male cross-country skiers
Living people
Olympic cross-country skiers of Czechoslovakia
Cross-country skiers at the 1972 Winter Olympics
Cross-country skiers at the 1976 Winter Olympics
FIS Nordic World Ski Championships medalists in cross-country skiing
People from Jilemnice
Sportspeople from the Liberec Region